The list is incomplete; please add known articles or create missing ones

The following is a list of articles on the human rights organisations of the world. It does not include political parties, or academic institutions. The list includes both secular and religious organizations.

International non-governmental organizations
Amazon Watch
Amnesty International
Anti-Slavery International
Article 19
Avocats Sans Frontières
Breakthrough
CARE
Carter Center
CCJO René Cassin
Center for Economic and Social Rights
Center for Human Rights & Humanitarian Law
Centre on Housing Rights and Evictions (COHRE)
Civil Rights Defenders
Coalition for the International Criminal Court
Commonwealth Human Rights Initiative
CryptoRights Foundation
Cultural Survival
Disabled Peoples' International
Enough Project
Equality Now
Euro-Mediterranean Human Rights Monitor
Every Human Has Rights
Forum 18
Fourth Estate
Free the Slaves
Freedom from Torture
Freedom House
Friends of Peoples Close to Nature
Front Line Defenders
Global Centre for the Responsibility to Protect
Global Rights
Gypsy International Recognition and Compensation Action
Habitat International Coalition
Helsinki Committee for Human Rights
Helsinki Watch
Hindu American Foundation
Hirschfeld Eddy Foundation
Humanists International
Human Life International
Human Rights First
Human Rights Foundation
Human Rights Internet
Human Rights Watch
HURIDOCS
IFEX
Independent Permanent Human Rights Commission
International Human Rights Administration (IHRA)
International Human Rights Association (IHRA)
Institute for War and Peace Reporting
Interamerican Association for Environmental Defense
International Alliance of Women
International Association of Jewish Lawyers and Jurists
International Center for Transitional Justice
International Centre for Human Rights and Democratic Development
International Centre for Human Rights Research
International Coalition against Enforced Disappearances
International Commission of Jurists
International Committee of the Red Cross (private, sovereign organisation)
International Crisis Group
International Disability Alliance
International Federation for Human Rights
International Federation of Red Cross and Red Crescent Societies
International Foundation for Human Rights and Tolerance
International Helsinki Federation for Human Rights (federation of 15 other human rights organizations not included in this list; now bankrupt due to fraud)
International Institute of Human Rights
International League for Human Rights
International Movement ATD Fourth World
International Partnership for Human Rights (IPHR)
International Property Rights Index
International Progress Organization
International Red Cross and Red Crescent Movement
International Rehabilitation Council for Torture Victims
International Rescue Committee
International Service for Human Rights
International Society for Human Rights
International Tibet Network
International Work Group for Indigenous Affairs
Islamic Human Rights Commission
JUSTICE
MindFreedom International
Minority Rights Group International
National Labor Committee in Support of Human and Worker Rights
Network for Education and Academic Rights
No Peace Without Justice
Norwegian Refugee Council
Peace Brigades International
People & Planet
Physicians for Human Rights
Point of Peace Foundation
Protection International
Refugees International
Release International
Reporters Without Borders
Reprieve
Redress Trust
Robert F. Kennedy Human Rights
Scholars at Risk
Scholar Rescue Fund
Shia Rights Watch
Society for Threatened Peoples
Survival International
Tahirih Justice Center
The Advocacy Project
The RINJ Foundation
The Sentinel Project for Genocide Prevention
Tostan
Transparency International
UN Watch
UNITED for Intercultural Action
Unrepresented Nations and Peoples Organization
World Council of Churches
World Organization Against Torture
WITNESS
Womankind Worldwide
World Future Council
World Organization Against Torture
Youth for Human Rights International

Regional non-governmental organizations
African Movement of Working Children and Youth (Africa)
AIRE Centre (Europe)
Arabic Network for Human Rights Information (Arab world)
Arab Commission for Human Rights (Arab world)
Asian Forum for Human Rights and Development (Asia)
Asian Human Rights Commission (Asia)
Asian Centre for Human Rights (Asia)
Commonwealth Human Rights Initiative (Commonwealth nations)
Council on Hemispheric Affairs (Americas)
Ecumenical Center for Human Rights (Americas)
EuroMed Rights (Euro-Mediterranean region)
European Human Rights Society (Europe)
European Roma Rights Centre (Europe)
Federal Union of European Nationalities (Europe)
Helsinki Citizens Assembly (Europe)
Human Rights Trust of Southern Africa (Southern Africa)
Incomindios Switzerland (Americas)
International Association of Independent Journalists Inc. (Canada, England & elsewhere)
Journalists for Human Rights (Africa)
Kurdish Human Rights Project (Iraq, Turkey, Syria, Iran & elsewhere)
Memorial (Ex-USSR)
Regional Council on Human Rights in Asia (Southeast Asia)
Unimondo (southeastern Europe)
Washington Office on Latin America (Latin America)
The Youth Cafe (Africa)

Non-governmental organisations with a national focus

For governmental national human rights organisations see national human rights institution.

Argentina

HIJOS
Mothers of the Plaza de Mayo
Movimiento Judío por los Derechos Humanos

Armenia

Open Society Foundations–Armenia

Australia

 Australian Council for Human Rights Education
 Castan Centre for Human Rights Law
 Human Rights Law Centre

Bahrain

Bahrain Centre for Human Rights
Bahrain Human Rights Society
Bahrain Human Rights Watch Society
Bahrain Youth Society for Human Rights
We Have A Right

Belgium

Association belge des familles des disparus
Liga voor Mensenrechten
Ligue des droits de l'homme

Bosnia and Herzegovina
Association for Social Research and Communications (UDIK)

Burma (Myanmar)

Burma Campaign UK
Canadian Friends of Burma
Free Burma Rangers
Human Rights Defenders and Promoters
Karen Human Rights Group
U.S. Campaign for Burma
Women's League of Burma

Bulgaria

Bulgarian Helsinki Committee

Cambodia

Cambodian Center for Human Rights
 The Cambodian League for the Promotion and Defense of Human Rights (LICADHO)
ADHOC

Canada

Child Welfare League of Canada

Chad

Chadian Association for the Promotion and Defense of Human Rights

Chile

 Association of Families of the Detained-Disappeared (AFDD; 1974)
  (1978)
  (CODEPU; 1980)
 Committee of Cooperation for Peace in Chile (1973–1975)
  (CODEH; 1970)
 Families of the Executed for Political Reasons (1974)
  (FASIC; 1975)
 National Commission Against Torture
 National Commission for Truth and Reconciliation (1990–1991); better known as the Rettig Commission
  (MCTSA; 1983–1990)
 Vicariate of Solidarity (1976–1990)

China

Civil Human Rights Front (Hong Kong)
Empowerment and Rights Institute
Hong Kong Human Rights Monitor (Hong Kong)
Human Rights in China
Information Centre for Human Rights and Democracy

Tibet

 Free Tibet
 International Campaign for Tibet
 Political Prisoners Movement of Tibet
 Students for a Free Tibet
 Tibetan Centre for Human Rights and Democracy

Egypt

Arabic Network for Human Rights Information
Egyptian Center for Economic and Social Rights
Egyptian Initiative for Personal Rights
Egyptian Organization for Human Rights
Hisham Mubarak Law Center
National Council for Human Rights
Shayfeencom

Eritrea
Human Rights Concern Eritrea

Ethiopia

Ethiopian Human Rights Council
KMG Ethiopia

France

GISTI
Human Rights League (Ligue des droits de l'homme)
MRAP (French NGO)
SOS Racisme

Guatemala

ADIVIMA
HIJOS

Iceland

Icelandic Human Rights Centre

India

International Human Rights Administration
Confederation of Human Rights Organizations
Forum for Fact-finding Documentation and Advocacy
Honour for Women National Campaign
Human Rights Documentation Centre
Kashmir Human Rights Commission
Manab Adhikar Sangram Samiti 
National Campaign on Dalit Human Rights
Vigil India Movement

Iran

Defenders of Human Rights Center
Iran Human Rights Documentation Center

Israel

Israel
 Adalah (legal center)
 Association for Civil Rights in Israel
 B'Tselem
 Jerusalem Institute of Justice
 Machsom Watch
 Rabbis for Human Rights
 Physicians for Human Rights–Israel
 Yesh Din

Palestinian territories
 Al-Haq
 Al Mezan Center for Human Rights (Gaza Strip)

Italy

Emergency

Kenya
Cemiride
Awareness Against Human Trafficking (HAART)
Kenya Human Rights Commission

Lebanon

Association Najdeh

Malawi

Centre for Human Rights and Rehabilitation

Malaysia

Bersih
Lawyers for Liberty
Malaysians Against Death Penalty & Torture
National Human Rights Society
Sisters in Islam
Suara Rakyat Malaysia
Women's Aid Organisation

Mali

Association Malienne des Droits de l'Homme

Mauritania

Association Mauritanienne des Droits de l'Homme

Mexico

Morocco

Association Marocaine des Droits Humaine
Conseil Consultatif des Droits de l'Homme
Sahrawi Association of Victims of Grave Human Rights Violations Committed by the Moroccan State

Nepal

Amnesty Nepal
INSEC
THRD Alliance

Niger

Timidria

Nigeria

Devatop Centre for Africa Development
National Association of Seadogs
Youths For Human Rights Protection And Transparency Initiative

North Korea

Chosun Journal
Liberty in North Korea

Pakistan

Asian Human Rights Development Organization

Peru 

 Coordinadora Nacional de Derechos Humanos

Philippines

Amnesty International Philippines
Asian Federation Against Involuntary Disappearances
Campaign for Human Rights in the Philippines
Free Legal Assistance Group
International Peace Observers Network
Karapatan
Nonviolent Peaceforce
Philippine Alliance of Human Rights Advocates
Philippine Human Rights Information Center
Philippines–Canada Task Force on Human Rights
Task Force Detainees of the Philippines

Poland

Movement for Defense of Human and Civic Rights (20th century)

Russia

Glasnost Defense Foundation
Moscow Research Center for Human Rights
SOVA Center
Chechnya:
Chechnya Advocacy Network

Saudi Arabia

ALQST
Association for the Protection and Defense of Women's Rights in Saudi Arabia
Center for Democracy and Human Rights in Saudi Arabia
European Saudi Organisation for Human Rights
Human Rights First Society
Saudi Civil and Political Rights Association
Society for Development and Change

South Korea
Database Center for North Korean Human Rights

Sri Lanka

Home for Human Rights
NESOHR
University Teachers for Human Rights

Sweden
Stepchildren of Society
Swedish International Development Cooperation Agency

Syria

al-Marsad

Taiwan

 Taiwan Association for Human Rights

Thailand

 Amnesty International Thailand
 Anjaree
 EMPOWER

Tunisia

Tunisia Monitoring Group

Uganda

Resolve Uganda

Ukraine

Kharkiv Human Rights Protection Group
Ukrainian Helsinki Human Rights Union

United Kingdom

Liberty
Peter Tatchell Foundation
Northern Ireland:
 Committee on the Administration of Justice

United States

ACLU
Alliance for Human Research Protection
Avaaz
Center for Constitutional Rights
Center for Victims of Torture
Ella Baker Center for Human Rights
Empowering Spirits Foundation
Hands Up United
Human Rights Campaign
Human Rights Commission of Salt Lake City
Human Rights Initiative of North Texas
Humanitarian Law Project
International Justice Mission
Jewish Voice for Peace
Meiklejohn Civil Liberties Institute
National Youth Rights Association
Lantos Foundation for Human Rights and Justice
Lawyers' Committee for Civil Rights Under Law
Society for Human Rights (Disbanded)
Southern Poverty Law Center
US Human Rights Network
Workplace Fairness

Venezuela

PROVEA (1988) Spanish acronym for the Venezuelan Education-Action Program on Human Rights
Venezuelan Observatory of Social Conflict (2010)

Zimbabwe

Zimbabwe Lawyers for Human Rights

United Nations Bodies

Office of the United Nations High Commissioner for Human Rights
United Nations Security Council
Sub-Commission on the Promotion and Protection of Human Rights
United Nations Human Rights Council
United Nations Commission on Human Rights (disbanded)
International Criminal Court
OSCE Representative on Freedom of the Media
UNESCO
United Nations Parliamentary Assembly

Human rights treaty bodies
Human Rights Committee
Committee on the Elimination of Racial Discrimination
Committee on the Elimination of Discrimination against Women
Committee Against Torture
Committee on the Rights of the Child

Other multilateral organisations
 African Commission on Human and Peoples' Rights
 African Court on Human and Peoples' Rights
 American Convention on Human Rights
 Arab Organization for Human Rights
 Commissioner for Human Rights
 Committee for the Prevention of Torture
 Commonwealth of Nations
 European Court of Human Rights
 OAS Special Rapporteur for Freedom of Expression
 Subcommittee on Human Rights
 Inter-American Commission on Human Rights
 Inter-American Court of Human Rights

See also

List of human rights awards
List of civil rights leaders
List of indigenous rights organizations
List of LGBT rights organizations
List of women's organizations
List of women's conferences

References 

Human rights
 
Human rights-related lists
International relations lists